Jinpa (Tibetan: ལག་དམར་, "Butcher" or "Murderer") is a 2018 Chinese Tibetan-language film written and directed by Pema Tseden. The screenplay is based on the novels The Slayer by Tsering Norbu and I Ran Over a Sheep by Pema. It made its world premiere and won Best Screenplay in the Horizons section at the 75th edition of the Venice Film Festival.

Plot 
Truck driver Jinpa (Jinpa) accidentally runs over and kills a sheep as he traverses on an isolated road on the Kekexili Plateau. He then picks up a young hitchhiker (Genden Phuntsok) who is on his way to kill a man who murdered his father 10 years ago. Although they part way later, the coincidence of these two incidents haunts Jinpa. He tries to track down the hitchhiker and stop the murder.

Cast   
 Jinpa as truck driver Jinpa
 Genden Phuntsok as hitchhiker Jinpa
 Sonam Wangmo as bar owner
 Japal Tso
 Dargye Tenzin

Awards and nominations

References

External links  

2018 films
Tibetan-language films
Films shot in Tibet
Films directed by Pema Tseden
Chinese drama films